Travail was an American, Christian nu metal/metalcore band based in the Dallas/Fort Worth area in Texas. Fronted by Matt Leslie, it had an intense following at Club 412, a local church-sponsored lounge and music venue located in southwest Fort Worth.

Stylistic comparisons were often drawn between their sound and that of secular rock acts popular at the time such as Korn and Limp Bizkit. The band was signed on Pluto Records and then were picked up by national label Metro One. After releasing their second album, Beautiful Loneliness, on the Metro One label, Travail received a nomination for the 2001 Dove Awards in the Hard Music Recorded Song category. Before touring much under the new label, however, Travail broke up. Their most requested song, "Judge Me" is still a very popular song and the video for "Return" is still a popular video among those who enjoy the rapcore/nu metal genre.
Guitarist Aaron Wiese later joined the band Spoken, but left in 2008.

Members Matt Leslie, Brian Hoover, Daniel McKay, and Duane Smith have started a new band with Travis Knight as their second guitarist. The new band is Southern Train Gypsy. Although not a band anymore, Matthew Leslie has retired from music, and the other members have formed a new band as of 2018.

Members
Current
Matt Leslie - vocals (1996-2001)
Brian Hoover - guitar
Duane Smith - bass
Daniel McKay - drums (1996-2001)

Former
Kyle Magnon - guitar
Tim Bowman - guitar
Aaron Weise - guitar
Cliff Wright - bass

Discography
1998: Anchor of my Soul (Independent)
1999: Travail + Luti-Kriss (EP, Pluto Records, Review: HM Magazine)
1999: Travail (Pluto Records, Review: The Phantom Tollbooth)
2000: Beautiful Loneliness (Metro One, Reviews: The Phantom Tollbooth, Cross Rhythms)

References

External links
 Travail Fan Site (Myspace)

American Christian metal musical groups
American nu metal musical groups
Christian rock groups from Texas
Heavy metal musical groups from Texas
Rapcore groups